The Free Democrats is a political organization formed by former members of the Progress Party of Norway in 1994.

The 1993 election saw the support of the Progress Party (6.3 percent and 10 representatives) halved. After the 1994 Progress Party national convention several representatives of the "libertarian wing" broke out and founded a party more ideologically consistently libertarian, the Free Democrats. Four of the defectors were MPs, and formed an independent group in Parliament of Norway.

Its first leader Ellen Christine Christiansen was among the four MPs, and also served in Oslo city council until 1995.

In the Norwegian county elections, 1995 the party received 1,932 votes, 0.09% of the votes. The Free Democrats no longer participate in elections and function merely as a think tank and organization for Norwegian libertarians, regardless of their political allegiance. People associated with the Free Democrats also founded the online newspaper Liberaleren.

Issues
According to its webpage, its main policies are:
 End conscription
 Full free trade
 Separation of church and state
 Legalization of drugs
 Free immigration

Presidents of the Free Democrats
1994–1996 : Ellen Christine Christiansen
1996–1998 : Heidi Nordby Lunde
1998–1999 : Bent Johan Mosfjell
1999–2000 : Kristian Norheim
2000–2003 : Hans Jørgen Lysglimt
2003–2005 : Sverre Berg

See also
Liberal People's Party, a party with a similar ideology

References

Liberal parties in Norway
Political parties established in 1994
1994 establishments in Norway